Jawji Babaji Gawli was also referred to as Jauji Gauli or Javji Gauli or Jivaji Gauli was a Sardar (Chieftain) in the Peshwa army during the reign of Balaji Baji Rao.

Family Background
Born to Babaji Gawli, he had a brother named Maloji. He was a resident of Khare Patan, a village in the Sindhudurg district of Konkan, Western Maharashtra.

Historical Role
Jawji Gawli's major historical role was during the Anglo-Maratha-Angre wars of 1755 and 1756. He fought in the Battle of Suvarnadurg and Vijaydurg

This period was during the reign of Peshwa Balaji Baji Rao, popularly known as Nanasaheb Peshwa. The relations between Peshwas and Angres were not the best. Tulaji Angre was a source of worry for the English, Portuguese and also the Peshwas. Tulaji was ambitious and capable and did not wish to be subordinate to the Peshwa. He plundered the ships of English, Portuguese and began to levy contributions from the Peshwa's own territories.

The Peshwas took the help of English to wage a war upon Tulaji Angre who was one of the sons of Kanhoji Angre. Peshwas and English jointly attacked Suvarnadurg The joint siege of the fort lasted from 25 March to 2 April 1755. On 12 April 1755, Sir William James, 1st Baronet captured the fort and formally handed it over to the Peshwas.

Role in Key Battles

Jawji Gawli fought along with Khandoji Mankar on behalf of the Peshwas. He represented the Peshwas during negotiations and was associated with the Konkan Governor of Peshwa - Ramji Mahadev Biwalkar. He negotiated with Tulaji Angre prior to the commencement of English-Peshwa attack on Vijaydurg fort. His significant historical role has been provided in great details in the book 'Peshwaiche Divya Tej' authored by Vithal Waman Hadap published in 1940. Peshwaiche Divya Tej – Vithal Waman Hadap (Published 1940)

 A history of Maratha Navy and Merchant Ships – Dr. B K Apte (Published January 1973)

Letters from Nanasaheb Peshwa
The famous historical archives in Pune - Peshwa Daftar – Part 24 has letters which provide references

a. Letter no 142 – Jawji Gawli Kharepatankar

b. Letter no 152/153 – Maloji Gawli

c. Letter no 156 – Letter from Peshwas to Jawji Gawli

Significance of Battle of Vijaydurg (Gheriah)
Vijaydurg Fort was called the "Eastern Gibraltar", as it was virtually impregnable. The British failed to take this fort from 1718 till 1756. The taking of Vijaydurg was amongst the most significant battles and a defining moment in the Maratha Naval history. The Angres held sway from Surat in the north to Konkan in the south severely affecting British trade interests. The British-Peshwa joint victory over Tulaji Angre therefore paved the way for unhindered access for British ships on India’s western coast, which was hitherto denied by the Angres. A different outcome of this battle could have changed the course of British rule in India or at least postponed it. One could say that the Battle of Vijaydurg (1756) was perhaps the maritime equivalent of Battle of Plassey (1757).

Migration of Descendents
The descendents of Jawji Gawli and Mahuji Gawli later migrated to Northern Maharashtra, first at Ahergaon and subsequently settled in Chalisgaon in Jalgaon district.

This history of the family has been documented by late Shri Valsing Ishram Patil through his autobiography that was written in April 1958.

Notes

People of the Maratha Empire
18th-century military personnel